Holger Mitterer (born 4 January 1973) is a German cognitive scientist and linguist and associate professor at the University of Malta. He is known for his works on applied psycholinguistics.
Mitterer is co-editor-in-chief with Cynthia Clopper of Language and Speech.
He is a former associate editor of Laboratory Phonology (2013-2018) and a member of the editorial board of the Journal of Phonetics.

Select publications
 Mitterer, H., & Reinisch, E., & McQueen, J.M. (2018). Allophones, not phonemes in spoken-word recognition. Journal of Memory and Language. doi: 10.1016/j.jml.2017.09.005 
 Mitterer, H. (2018). Not all geminates are created equal: Evidence from Maltese glottal consonants. Journal of Phonetics, 66, 28-44. doi:10.1016/j.wocn.2017.09.003 
 Mitterer, H., & Reinisch, E. (2015). Letters don't matter: No effect of orthography on the perception of conversational speech. Journal of Memory and Language, 85, 116-134. doi:10.1016/j.jml.2015.08.005 
 Mitterer, H., Scharenborg, O., & McQueen, J.M. (2013). Phonological abstraction without phonemes in speech perception. Cognition, 129, 356-361. doi:10.1016/j.cognition.2013.07.011 
 Mitterer, H., & McQueen, J.M. (2009). Foreign subtitles help but native-language subtitles harm foreign speech perception. PLoS One, 4, A146-A150. doi:10.1371/journal.pone.0007785  
 Escudero, P., Hayes-Harb, R., & Mitterer, H. (2008). Novel second-language words and asymmetric lexical access. Journal of Phonetics, 36(2), 345–360. doi:10.1016/j.wocn.2007.11.002
 Ruiter, J.-P. de, Mitterer, H., & Enfield, N. J. (2006). Projecting the End of a Speaker’s Turn: A Cognitive Cornerstone of Conversation. Language, 82(3), 515–535. doi:10.1353/lan.2006.0130

References

External links
Personal Website

Living people
Academic staff of the University of Malta
Maastricht University alumni
Linguists from Germany
German cognitive scientists
Bielefeld University alumni
Leiden University alumni
1973 births
Max Planck Institutes researchers
Phoneticians
Phonologists
Linguistics journal editors
Psycholinguists
People from Hanau
Experimental psychologists
Speech perception researchers
Speech production researchers